The Prairie River station, located in the hamlet of Prairie River within the rural municipality of Porcupine No. 395, Saskatchewan, was built by the Canadian Northern Railway. The 2-story, wood-frame railway station was completed in 1919.  The building is no longer used as a railway station and now houses the Prairie River Museum.

References

External links
Museums Association of Saskatchewan Description

Canadian National Railway stations in Saskatchewan
Canadian Northern Railway stations in Saskatchewan
Railway stations in Canada opened in 1919
Disused railway stations in Canada
Porcupine No. 395, Saskatchewan
Museums in Saskatchewan
Heritage sites in Saskatchewan